Ang Shim Jung is a 2010 South Korean television series starring Yeo Hyun-soo, Kim Ha-eun, Kwon Hae-hyo and Lee Ki-young. It aired on E Channel from October 28, 2010, to January 20, 2011, on Thursdays at 00:00 (KST) for 13 episodes.

Plot
Secret organization Twelve Zodiac Animals controls Joseon through government officials and is involved in all kinds of crimes, from corruption to murders. To stop it, the king creates the secret society Ang Shim Jung, but the Twelve Zodiac Animals succeed in stealing the throne, and Ang Shim Jung's members are forced to hide in a gibang, where they begin to develop a plan for revenge. Following the murder of her parents, noblewoman Min Chung-seol joins Ang Shim Jung, where she meets Kang Ye-rang.

Cast
 Yeo Hyun-soo as Kang Ye-rang
 Kim Ha-eun as Min Chung-seol
 Kwon Hae-hyo as Yoon Geuk-gum
 Lee Ki-young as Kang Seung-won
  as Moon Ik-gyum
  as Kim Cheo-in
  as Kim Pan-gon
 Jung Eun-pyo as Lee Ja-chool
  as Min
 Kim So-won as Myo-hwa
 Ji Sang-min as Doo-ryong
  as Oh Son
 Cha Chung-hwa as gisaeng
  as Hong Dan
  as Park Jung-do
  as Choi Dong-soon
 Jung Tong as Dol-soe
 Yoon Bae-young as Ekku
 Park Min-seok as Hwang Gyo-wi
 Kim Kyu-chul as Min Ki-chul
 Lee Se-chang as king
 Yoon Seo-hyun as Baek Joong-hak
 Lee Chul-min as Lee Myung-hwa
  as head of the slave market
 Bae Noo-ri as Myung-wol

Awards and nominations

References

External links
  
 

2010 South Korean television series debuts
2011 South Korean television series endings
Korean-language television shows
South Korean historical television series
Television series set in the Joseon dynasty
Martial arts television series